The following is a list of LM-series integrated circuits. Many were among the first analog integrated circuits commercially produced since late 1965; some were groundbreaking innovations. As of 2007, many are still being used. The LM series originated with integrated circuits made by National Semiconductor. The prefix LM stands for linear  monolithic, referring to the analog components integrated onto a single piece of silicon. Because of the popularity of these parts, many of them were second-sourced by other manufacturers who kept the sequence number as an aid to identification of compatible parts. Several generations of pin-compatible descendants of the original parts have since become de facto standard electronic components.

Operational amplifiers

Differential comparators

Current-mode (Norton) amplifiers

Instrumentation amplifiers

Audio amplifiers

Precision reference

Voltage regulators

Voltage-to-frequency converters

Current sources

Temperature sensors and thermostats

Others

See also
 List of linear integrated circuits
 4000-series integrated circuits, List of 4000-series integrated circuits
 7400-series integrated circuits, List of 7400-series integrated circuits
 Pin compatibility

Notes 
 Suffixes that denote specific versions of the part (e.g. LM305 vs. LM305A) are not shown in this list.
 Obsolete 4-bit microprocessors of the LM6400 family, manufactured by Sanyo, have no relationship to the analog LM series and are not included in this list.
 The first digit of each part denote different temperature ranges. Mostly, LM1xx indicates military-grade temperature range of -55 °C to +125 °C, LM2xx indicates industrial-grade temperature range of -25 °C to +85 °C and LM3xx indicates commercial temperature range of 0 °C to 70 °C.
 Some obsolete parts continue to be manufactured by different companies other than the original manufacturer.

References

Further reading
Historical Data Books
 Linear Databook (1980, 1376 pages), National Semiconductor
 Linear Databook 1 (1988, 1262 pages), National Semiconductor
 Linear Databook 2 (1988, 934 pages), National Semiconductor
 Linear Databook 3 (1988, 930 pages), National Semiconductor
 Linear and Interface Databook (1990, 1658 pages), Motorola
 Linear and MOSFET Databook (1982, 1082 pages), RCA

Historical Design Books
 Analog Applications Manual (1979, 418 pages), Signetics
 Linear Applications Handbook (1994, 1287 pages), National Semiconductor
 Linear Design Seminar Slide Book (1992, 502 pages), Texas Instruments
 Linear Design Seminar Reference Book (1993, 451 pages), Texas Instruments

Electronic design
Electronics lists
Linear integrated circuits